Bevercotes is a hamlet and civil parish in the Bassetlaw district of Nottinghamshire, England, about six miles south of East Retford and five miles north-east of Ollerton. According to the 2001 census it had a population of 28. The population remained less than 100 at the 2011 Census and is included in the civil parish of Bothamsall.

The former Bevercotes Colliery was one of the first fully automated coal mines in the country.

See also
 Bevercotes Colliery branch railway

References

External links

Hamlets in Nottinghamshire
Civil parishes in Nottinghamshire
Bassetlaw District